The Cormo is an Australian breed of sheep developed in Tasmania by crossing Corriedale rams with superfine Saxon Merino ewes in the early 1960s. The name Cormo is derived from the names of two of the parent breeds, Corriedale and Merino. The breed was fixed through intense selection criteria, assessed by objective measurement. Cormo sheep have a polled, open face, are possessed of a fast-growing, medium frame carrying a fleece of about 18 to 23 microns in diameter. High fertility is an attribute, too.

The breed is mostly found in the south eastern states of Australia.

Cormos have also been exported to Argentina, China, the United States, Italy and Belgium.

References

Stephens, M (et al.), Handbook of Australian Livestock, Australian Meat & Livestock Export Corporation, 2000 (4th ed),

External links
 American Cormo Sheep Association
 Cormo Sheep Conservation Registry

Sheep breeds originating in Australia
Sheep breeds